Seborga is a small village and self-proclaimed principality in the region of Liguria near the French border. Administratively, it is a comune of the Italian province of Imperia. The main economic activities are horticulture and tourism. It is known for being the 'territory' of the self-proclaimed micronation the Principality of Seborga.

Economy
Seborga is known in the region for its agricultural activity: in particular, cultivation and collection of olives and floriculture crops. Thanks to Seborga's publicity as a principality, tourism has expanded in recent years. The principality's historic town centre was also restored, ensuring that its charms were protected from commercial overdevelopment.

Culture
An important cultural event in Seborga is the annual festival of Saint Bernard, the town's patron saint, held on August 20. Seborga's twin city is L'Escarène, France. The festival includes a procession of citizens and the carrying of a statue of Saint Bernard.

Transport
Seborga is situated along Provincial Road 57 in Imperia. The nearest motorway access is at the Bordighera exit on the A10. The nearest railway station is also the one in Bordighera, on the Ventimiglia-Genoa line.

Principality of Seborga

In the early 1960s, Giorgio Carbone, then head of the local flower growers' co-operative, began promoting the idea that Seborga and its surrounding territory should become independent from Italy. Carbone claimed that Seborga had existed as a sovereign state of Italy since 954, and that from 1079 it was a principality of the Holy Roman Empire. According to Carbone's claims, Seborga was not included in the 1861 Italian unification, and that it should be recognised as a sovereign principality.

In 1963 the people of Seborga held an informal vote and elected Carbone as their ostensible head of state. He then assumed the self-styled title His Tremendousness (Sua Tremendità) Giorgio I, Prince of Seborga. Carbone remained in office until his death in 2009. A successor, Marcello Menegatto, was elected in 2010. Menegatto resigned in 2019 from his position, and he was succeeded by his ex-wife, Nina Menegatto, who has styled herself Her Serene Highness Princess Nina.

Supporters of the independence claim promote the Principality with the trappings of a state, including the creation of a flag, minting of coins, the formation of a "border guard" and the installation of sentry boxes on the unofficial border crossing on the main road into Seborga. An official Principato di Seborga website asserts the historical arguments put forward by Carbone. The independence claims of a "Principality of Seborga" have not been recognised internationally, and Seborga remains officially part of Italy.

See also

 Passport to Pimlico (1949)  

 Cooking up a Country (2018)

References

External links

 Seborga official website
 Giorgio Carbone, Elected Prince of Seborga, Dies at 73

 
Cities and towns in Liguria